Sir Osmond Thomas Grattan Esmonde, 12th Baronet (4 April 1896 – 22 July 1936) was an Irish diplomat and Cumann na nGaedheal (and later Fine Gael) politician.

He was born in Ballynastragh, Gorey, County Wexford in 1896, the eldest son of Sir Thomas Esmonde. He was educated at Mount St Benedict School in Gorey; and the Downside School. He attended Balliol College, Oxford and University College Dublin, though he did not graduate from either.

After the 1916 Easter Rising, he joined Sinn Féin and campaigned at the 1918 general election for Roger Sweetman in Wexford North, even though his father was the sitting MP and Irish Parliamentary Party candidate.

Esmonde was first elected to the 4th Dáil at the 1923 general election as Cumann na nGaedheal Teachta Dála (TD) for the Wexford constituency. He did not contest the June 1927 general election, but was returned to the 6th Dáil in the September 1927 general election. He was re-elected at the 1932 general election, and again at the 1933 general election.

After his death aged 40 on 22 July 1936, the consequent by-election for his seat in Dáil Éireann was held on 17 August, and won by the Fianna Fáil candidate Denis Allen.

He never married and was succeeded in the baronetcy by his uncle Laurence Esmonde.

See also
Families in the Oireachtas

References

External links
Photographs of Sir Osmond Esmonde at the National Portrait Gallery (London)

1896 births
1936 deaths
Baronets in the Baronetage of Ireland
Cumann na nGaedheal TDs
Irish diplomats
Members of the 4th Dáil
Members of the 6th Dáil
Members of the 7th Dáil
Members of the 8th Dáil
Osmond
Fine Gael TDs
Football Association of Ireland officials